Rizwan Haider (born 16 June 1985) is a Pakistani cricketer who played for multiple teams including Baluchistan and Multan. He played in 70 first-class, 56 List A, and 34 Twenty20 matches between 2009 and 2018.

References

External links
 

1985 births
Living people
Pakistani cricketers
Baluchistan cricketers
Multan cricketers
People from Okara District